Claire Nitch (born 7 August 1971 in Johannesburg, South Africa) is a squash player from South Africa.

Nitch reached a career-high world ranking of World No. 9 in 1997. At the 1998 Commonwealth Games, she won a bronze medal in the women's doubles (partnering Natalie Grainger).

Nitch has won the South African national squash title nine times. As a junior, she also won the national under-19 and under-21 titles.

References

External links 
 
 

corr

1971 births
Living people
South African female squash players
Commonwealth Games bronze medallists for South Africa
Commonwealth Games medallists in squash
Squash players at the 1998 Commonwealth Games
Alumni of St Mary's School, Waverley
Sportspeople from Johannesburg
Medallists at the 1998 Commonwealth Games